

See also
 Timeline of Saint-Louis, Senegal

References

Rulers.org: Senegal
Lucie Gallistel Colvin. Historical Dictionary of Senegal. Scarecrow Press/ Metuchen. NJ–London (1981)   pp. 81–98 (Table 10).

 
Senegal
French West Africa
Colonial heads